Johnathan Ryan Taylor (born August 29, 1979) is a former American football defensive end in the National Football League. He was drafted out of Montana State University in the fourth round of the 2002 NFL Draft by the Detroit Lions. He also spent time with the NFL's Dallas Cowboys and the Atlanta Falcons, as well as the Los Angeles Avengers, and the Chicago Rush of the Arena Football League.

Taylor attended Montana State University and was a member of their football team, the Bobcats, graduating in 2002 with a degree in Health and Human Development. Shortly after retiring from professional football in 2005, he began a master's degree program (Higher Education Administration) at MSU, completing the program in 2009. Taylor later joined and became a staff member of the Montana State athletic department. He currently resides in Bozeman and works as a financial advisor with D.A. Davidson Companies.

References

External links
Arena Football League stats

1979 births
Living people
Sportspeople from Boulder, Colorado
American football defensive ends
Montana State Bobcats football players
Atlanta Falcons players
Dallas Cowboys players
Detroit Lions players
Los Angeles Avengers players
Chicago Rush players